Maria Assumpció Soler i Font (Girona, 22 April 1913 – Girona, 24 March 2004) was a Catalan writer and journalist. She was forced by linguistic repression under Franco to write in Spanish. While her articles were in Spanish, she published in the Journal of Gerona the first poem in Catalan language, "Thanksgiving".

Biography 
In her youth she was influenced by her uncle, an Esperantist and Catalanist. She was greatly affected by the execution of Joan Font in 1936 and the disappearance of her brother during the Spanish Civil War.

Selected works
Les cinc branques (1975).Various Authors. Engordany (Andorra): Editorial Esteve Albert i Corp. 
L' escollit (2005), Editorial Associació Suport a la Dona de Palafrugell. Edition of the 1959 award-winning work with the Fastenrath Award for Novel in the Floral Games of the Catalan Language in Exile, which had been unpublished. 
 Poems and more than 350 stories and articles published in : Gerunda, Educación y Cultura, Los Sitios, Revista de Girona, Presència i Punt Diari.

References

Bibliography 
Carme Ramilo i Martínez, Maria Assumpció Soler, mestra i escriptora entre dues dictadures. a la Revista de Girona, núm. 235, març-abril 2006, pàg. 77-81 (in Catalan)
Maria Assumpció Soler i Font, Diccionari Biogràfic de Dones (in Catalan)
Carme Ramilo i Martínez, Maria Assumpció Soler i Font (1913-2004): mestra i escriptora ex aequo, (Col·lecció dones amb nom propi), Palafrugell, Associació Support a la Dona de Palafrugell, 2007,  (in Catalan)

1913 births
2004 deaths
Women writers from Catalonia
People from Girona
Poets from Catalonia
Journalists from Catalonia
Spanish women poets
20th-century Spanish poets
20th-century Spanish women writers